Abdul Momin (died 16 July 2004) was a Bangladesh Awami League politician and a Jatiya Sangsad member representing the Netrokona-4 and Netrokona-2 constituencies.

Death
Momin died on 16 July 2004 in Bangladesh Medical College Hospital, Dhaka, Bangladesh.

References

1920s births
2004 deaths
People from Netrokona District
Awami League politicians
7th Jatiya Sangsad members
8th Jatiya Sangsad members
Year of birth missing
Place of birth missing